Lajos Nagy (born 17 December 1975 in Székesfehérvár) is a Hungarian football (midfielder) player who currently plays for Ceglédi VSE.

References
HLSZ 
MLSZ 

1975 births
Living people
Sportspeople from Székesfehérvár
Hungarian footballers
Association football midfielders
Fehérvár FC players
Gázszer FC footballers
Zalaegerszegi TE players
BFC Siófok players
SV Leibnitz Flavia Solva players
Ceglédi VSE footballers
Hungarian expatriate footballers
Expatriate footballers in Austria
Hungarian expatriate sportspeople in Austria